Philip Battley is an English actor.

Filmography

Film
Wild Target (2010)

TV movies
 Layover (film)|Layover (2012)
 The Trace (2012)
Friends and Crocodiles (2006)
Riot at the Rite (2005)
Footprints in the Snow (2005)

TV series
Doctors (2009, 2020)
Rosamunde Pilcher: Herzen im Wind (2008)
Lewis (2008)
Sold (2007)
Hollyoaks: In the City (2006)
Afterlife (2005)
The Courtroom (2004)
Hollyoaks (2004)

External links

Philip Battley, personal website

English male film actors
English male television actors
Male actors from London
Living people
Year of birth missing (living people)